The Memphis Giants were a minor league baseball team from Memphis, Tennessee, that played in the Class B Southern League in 1892, 1894, and 1895. The team was also known as the Memphis Lambs during part of the 1895 season. The 1894 team was awarded the Southern League pennant for having the best overall record.

Season-by-season results 

* In 1895, Memphis withdrew from the league before the completion of the season.

References 

Southern League (1885–1899) teams
Baseball teams established in 1892
Baseball teams disestablished in 1895
G
Professional baseball teams in Tennessee
1892 establishments in Tennessee
1895 disestablishments in Tennessee
Defunct baseball teams in Tennessee